Wenjing Subdistrict is a subdistrict situated within Tongzhou District, Beijing. It borders Liyuan Town and Linheli Subdistrict to its north, Zhangjiawan Town to its east, Taihu Subdistrict to its south, and Heizhuanghu Township to its west. 

Wenjing Subdistrict was created from part of Taihu Subdistrict in 2020.

Administrative division 
As of 2021, the subdistrict only covered 1 subdivision: Wenjing Subdistrict Virtual Community (文景街道虚拟社区). Its Administrative Division Code was 110112009498.

Gallery

See also 
 List of township-level divisions of Beijing

References 

Tongzhou District, Beijing
Subdistricts of Beijing